The St. Francis River is a tributary of the Mississippi River, about  long, in southeastern Missouri and northeastern Arkansas in the United States. The river drains a mostly rural area and forms part of the Missouri-Arkansas state line along the western side of the Missouri Bootheel.

Description and course
The river rises in a region of granite mountains in Iron County, Missouri, and flows generally southwardly through the Ozarks and the St. Francois Mountains near Missouri's highest point Taum Sauk. It passes through Lake Wappapello, which is formed by a dam constructed in 1941. Below the dam the river meanders through cane forests and willow wetlands or forested swamp, transitioning from a clear stream into a slow and silt-laden muddy river as it enters the flat lands of the Mississippi embayment. In its lower course the river parallels Crowleys Ridge and is part of a navigation and flood-control project that encompasses a network of diversion channels and ditches along it and the Castor and Little rivers. Below the mouth of the Little River in Poinsett County, Arkansas, the St. Francis is navigable by barge.

Along its course in Missouri, the river flows through the Mark Twain National Forest and past Sam A. Baker State Park and the towns of Farmington, Greenville and Fisk.  In Arkansas it passes the towns of St. Francis, Lake City, Marked Tree and Parkin, and continues through two additional namesakes of the river — St. Francis County, and St. Francis Township in northeastern Phillips County — ending its course adjoining the St. Francis National Forest.

In addition to the Little River, tributaries of the St. Francis include the Little St. Francis River, which joins it along its upper course in Missouri; the Tyronza River, which joins it in Arkansas; and the L'Anguille River, which joins it just above its mouth.

History
The river became the home of Cherokee Indians who attacked a boat on the Tennessee River on June 11, 1794 known as the Muscle Shoals Massacre and had removed to the west. The Spanish authorities allowed the Indian settlement to trade and the area flourished with a population greater than Arkansas Post.

Names
The origin of the river's name is unclear. It might refer to St. Francis of Assisi, the founder of the Franciscan order. None of the region's early explorers were Franciscans, however. One possibility is that Jacques Marquette, a Jesuit, named the river when he explored its mouth in 1673. Before his voyage down the Mississippi Marquette had spent some time at the mission of St. François Xavier, named for the Jesuit missionary Francis Xavier. The spelling of the river's name shifted from "François" to "Francis" in the early 20th century. A number of place names in the region stem from the river's name, including St. Francois County and the St. Francois Mountains.

The United States Board on Geographic Names settled on "St. Francis River" as the stream's name in 1899.  According to the Geographic Names Information System, historical names for the river have included:

See also
List of Arkansas rivers
List of Missouri rivers
River borders of U.S. states

References

External links
Columbia Gazetteer of North America entry
DeLorme (2004).  Arkansas Atlas & Gazetteer.  Yarmouth, Maine: DeLorme.  .
DeLorme (2002).  Missouri Atlas & Gazetteer.  Yarmouth, Maine: DeLorme.  .

Maps of Former St. Francis Lake in Northeast Arkansas

Rivers of Arkansas
Rivers of Missouri
Tributaries of the Mississippi River
Bodies of water of the Ozarks
Crowley's Ridge
Borders of Arkansas
Borders of Missouri
Bodies of water of Clay County, Arkansas
Bodies of water of Craighead County, Arkansas
Bodies of water of Crittenden County, Arkansas
Bodies of water of Cross County, Arkansas
Bodies of water of Greene County, Arkansas
Bodies of water of Lee County, Arkansas
Bodies of water of Phillips County, Arkansas
Bodies of water of Poinsett County, Arkansas
Bodies of water of St. Francis County, Arkansas
Rivers of Butler County, Missouri
Rivers of Dunklin County, Missouri
Rivers of Madison County, Missouri
Rivers of Wayne County, Missouri
Rivers of St. Francois County, Missouri
Rivers of Stoddard County, Missouri